Place Paul Doumer station is located on line  of the tramway de Bordeaux.

Location
The station is located by Place Paul Doumer in Bordeaux.

Junctions
 Buses of the TBC:

Close by
 Église Saint-Louis

See also
 TBC
 Tramway de Bordeaux

References

Bordeaux tramway stops
Tram stops in Bordeaux
Railway stations in France opened in 2007